Carlo Galletti (1888 – November 1915) was an Italian footballer who played as a defender. On 12 January 1913, he represented the Italy national football team on the occasion of a friendly match against France in a 1–0 away loss.

References

1888 births
1915 deaths
Italian footballers
Italy international footballers
Association football defenders